1014, is a Burmese historical drama film starring Kyaw Thu, Daung, Htun Ko Ko, Htoo Aung, Moht Moht Myint Aung, May Myint Mo, and Yadanar Bo. The film, produced by Wa Re Zein Film Production, premiered in Myanmar on December 19, 2019.

Cast
Kyaw Thu as Mate Tala
Daung as Nga Phone Sar
Htun Ko Ko as Nga Yaut Tin
Htoo Aung as Phat Hta Rar
Moht Moht Myint Aung as O Pan Si
May Myint Mo as O Pan Lal
Yadanar Bo as O Pone Lal
Khine Htoo Thar as Shin Thuwala
Min Thu as Tapar Su
Nyi Jaw as Thahtay Oo Pazin
Htoo Thar as A Mat Phon Ma Kyan
Kaung Myat as Kyaung Phyu Min
Zin Mi Mi Kyaw as Miphayar Nge
Zaw Win Naing as Yarthinpa
Nyi Nyi Min Htet as Nga Sin Pha

References

External links

2019 films
2019 drama films
2010s Burmese-language films
Burmese drama films
Films shot in Myanmar